Georgie Barrat  is a British tech journalist and television presenter, best known as a presenter on The Gadget Show.

Early life 
Barrat graduated from King's College London with a degree in English Literature. She later gained a diploma in Radio Production. Since then Barrat has appeared on Radio 2 and TalkSport.

Career 
Barrat has written for Marie Claire, Huffington Post and The Mirror and has spoken on the subject for the likes of ITV, Channel 4 and the BBC.

Barrat is the resident tech expert on ITV's Weekend, where she talks Aled Jones through the newest gadgets while working with the production team to help source and create the feature. Georgie is also Carphone Warehouse's YouTube presenter and delivers Tech City News' weekly video roundup.

In 2017, Barrat joined The Gadget Show as a co-host alongside Craig Charles, Ortis Deley and Jon Bentley. In August 2017, she presented Can Crooks Hack Your Home?: Tonight for ITV.

Personal life and advocacy
Barrat has a passion for getting more girls into coding and is an advocate for charities Stemettes and Baytree Centre, both of which encourage 11–14-year-olds to study STEM subjects at GCSE level and beyond.

On 25 November 2021, Barrat posted on Instagram that she was six months pregnant and is expecting a baby girl.

References

External links
Personal website
 

Living people
English television presenters
1989 births